The Time-Out Chair is a short film written and directed by Josh Selig in 2002. It was produced by Little Airplane Productions, a New York studio that Selig co-founded with Lori Shaer. The film premiered at the 2003 Tribeca Film Festival and was later acquired by the Museum of Modern Art.

Synopsis
The film follows a preschool-aged girl who leaves her classroom after being sent to the time-out chair. She spends the afternoon in the East Village of New York, dragging the chair behind her.

History
The film's music was composed by Mark Suozzo. The Time-Out Chair was originally screened at the 2003 Tribeca Film Festival. The Museum of Modern Art in Midtown Manhattan acquired the film in 2004. It was included as part of the museum's family film screening on January 15, 2011. It was featured as the second short in MoMA's "Figuring Out Feelings" series on March 5, 2016.

References

External links
Page on Little Airplane Productions (archive)

2003 short films
2003 films
American short films
2000s English-language films